Maari is the soundtrack album for the 2015 Tamil film of the same name, starring Dhanush and Kajal Aggarwal in the lead roles, directed by Balaji Mohan. The soundtrack album was composed by Anirudh Ravichander, with three songs written by Dhanush, and the rest of the songs written by Vignesh Shivan and G. Rokesh. The film marks the third collaboration between Dhanush and Anirudh Ravichander. The audio rights were purchased by Sony Music and the soundtrack album was released on 7 June 2015, receiving positive reception.

Development 
Anirudh Ravichander, who was supposed to work with Balaji Mohan for Vaayai Moodi Pesavum, was selected as the film's music director marking his fifth collaboration with Wunderbar Films, and third with Dhanush after 3 and Velaiilla Pattadhari. The film's soundtrack consists of four songs and a theme music, as of April 2015, and the recording for the songs going on for three months. Fans can expect a pakka mass album, say sources and the atmosphere in theaters is bound to be electric. The album is reported to brim with a local, earthy charm. Dhanush penned three songs for the film, and the other two tracks were penned by Vignesh Shivan and Rokesh. Popular Malayalam actor and singer Vineeth Srinivasan has also sung a number in the film. Actor Dhanush recently revealed a couple of lines from the title track, which is said to be based on pigeon racing. The lines go like this, 'Maari' Konjam Nalla Maari' Romba Vera Maari Maari' Thecha Thangam Maari' Moracha Singam Maari.'

Release 
Sony Music purchased the audio rights of the film. It was announced that, the audio was initially slated to release on 25 May 2015, by the makers, however it was later announced by Balaji Mohan that the audio will release on 4 June 2015. The songs were released on 7 June 2015 at midnight. The theme music and the song teaser, was released on 16 July 2015.

Reception 
Behindwoods.com gave the album 3 stars out of 5 and Called it "Style à la north Chennai !!." Karthik From Milliblog Stated "the soundtrack's best are Don’u Don’u, a captivating call-and-response duet featuring Anirudh and Alisha Thomas, and Oru vidha aasai, with a wonderfully articulated 80s swagger and Vineeth Sreenivasan in blistering form. So-So Maari, but for these two songs." Indiaglitz rated the album 3 out of 5, and gave a verdict "Hooks you Maari style!" Sify rated the album 3 out of 5, and stated that "Anirudh delivers a middling album that needs time to grow!" MusicAloud rated the album 7 out of 10, and stated that "Out-and-out dancy soundtrack from Anirudh. And an engaging one at that." BollywoodLife rated the album 3.5 out of 5 and summarised that "Packed with a series of foot tapping numbers, Maari album by Dhanush and Anirudh Ravichander is high on energy and has enough to keep you entertained. Having said that this album by DnA is not upto the high standards set by the music of 3 and VIP. Nevertheless, the songs are enjoyable and way better than the kind of music coming out these days." Sharanya CR from The Times of India, reviewed it as "The album sounds less Anirudh and more local."

Track listing

References 

2015 soundtrack albums
Sony Music India soundtracks
Tamil film soundtracks
Anirudh Ravichander soundtracks